Catherine Ellen Lovelock  (born 1964) is an Australian marine ecologist, whose research focuses on coastal ecosystems. She is a professor in the School of Biological Science at the University of Queensland and 2020 Georgina Sweet Australian Laureate Fellow.

Education 
Lovelock has a BSc from the University of Western Australia.  She received a fellowship from the Australian Institute of Marine Science to support her research for her PhD, titled "Adaptation of tropical mangroves to high solar radiation" from James Cook University (1991).

Career 
Lovelock began her research career with the Australian Institute of Marine Science in 1991–2. She moved to the Australian National University in 1993–4 and then continued her research at the Smithsonian Tropical Research Institute in Panama in 1995–2005. In 2005 she joined the University of Queensland, while continuing her association with the STRI. 

Her long-term research has shown that damming waterways has adversely affected mangroves, particularly through the loss of mud. Writing with Daniel A. Friess, J. Boone Kauffman and James W. Fourqurean, she contributed a chapter to A Blue Carbon Primer: The State of Coastal Westland Carbon Science, Practice and Policy. 

In 2020 she was awarded an Australian Laureate Fellowship and the Georgina Sweet Australian Laureate Fellowship for her research project focussing on coastal ecosystems and the effects on them of climate change and how blue carbon may mitigate those effects.

Lovelock was elected a Fellow of the Australian Academy of Science in May 2021 and is recognised as a global expert on coastal ecosystems, particularly those involving mangroves. She and Terry Hughes were awarded the Suzanne Cory Medal jointly in March 2023.

Selected works

Journal articles 
Most cited per Google Scholar:

References 

1964 births
Living people
University of Western Australia alumni
James Cook University alumni
Academic staff of the University of Queensland
Fellows of the Australian Academy of Science
Australian marine biologists
Australian ecologists
Women ecologists
Australian women scientists